Fort William Football Club is a senior football team from Fort William, Lochaber, Scotland. They play in the North Caledonian Football League having being relegated from the 2021–22 Highland Football League.

History

Origins and the early years

The club was founded in 1974 by then chairman Colin Neilson and started out playing mainly friendlies and cup competitions, such as the Scottish Qualifying Cup, the North of Scotland Cup and the Inverness Cup.

This lasted for 11 years, before they joined the North Caledonian League in 1983. The club enjoyed much success in their two-year spell in the North Caledonian League. They won both the Chic Allan Cup and Morris Newton / SWL Cup in successive seasons, while also winning the Football Times Cup and finishing as runners-up in the league in the 1983–84 season. However, the season after, 1984–85, they won the division outright, making it their only league championship victory to date.

Ever since forming in 1974, the club had tirelessly campaigned for entry into the Highland League, but were rejected many times before they were admitted to the North Caledonian League in 1983. 
After significant success in their brief spell in the NCL, the club were finally given entry to the Highland League, and began life there in the 1985–86 season.

Fort William played their first-ever Highland League match against nearest rivals Clachnacuddin in a game which The Fort won, with striker Gordon MacIntyre scoring their maiden Highland League goal in a 1–0 home win. 
Later that season, they recorded their highest-ever attendance of 1,500 when they entertained Scottish Football League side Stirling Albion in the Scottish Cup 2nd round, holding them to a 0–0 draw, before losing 6–0 in the replay at Annfield a week later.

Prior to the days of the Highland League and the North Caledonian League, the club produced, arguably, their most famous player to date. In the late 1970s, John McGinlay made his senior debut for Fort William at the age of 14, coming on as a substitute in a North of Scotland Cup tie with now Scottish Professional Football League side Elgin City (formerly of the Highland League). 
At the age of 17, he moved to Nairn County, and would later go on to play in the Premier League with Bolton Wanderers and eventually represent Scotland. He was childhood friends with another, now former, professional footballer Duncan Shearer, who also hailed from Fort William.

Recent times

The club was unable to build upon their relatively competitive start to life in the Highland League, and gradually, season-by-season, began to struggle to the point where they had finished bottom in 14 of the 18 seasons between 1996–97 and 2013–14. Their struggles included a record 17–0 away defeat in 1998, to now Scottish League One side Peterhead. Despite this, The Fort did not finish bottom that season, with the wooden spoon going to Nairn County. In the 2008–09 season, they accumulated only a solitary point from 28 matches, making it the Highland League's record lowest points total since its inception.

During the 2008–09 season, an exciting future appeared forthcoming, when television producer and former Lochaber resident, Paul MacDonald, unveiled his vision for the football team. In conjunction with his American Entertainment company, PMAC Tonight, he planned to create a reality TV series based around the toiling team. The premise was to import some of the best young American talent from college campuses across the USA, in an attempt to take Fort William "From Worst to First", in what was envisaged to be the ultimate underdog story. However, after much initial media hype, the project failed to materialise.

The club formerly fielded a reserve side in the North Caledonian Football League, but were forced to disband this team prior to the 2011–12 season due to a lack of playable pitches in the Fort William area - something that has always plagued the club. They were, however, able to set up an Under 19s team, which was formed with the sole purpose of participating in the Scottish Youth Cup.

In January 2015, the club made history when it recorded four consecutive league victories for the first time since joining the Highland League, after a 2–1 success over Clachnacuddin.

The club's continuing presence in the Highland League was threatened in early 2018 as all six directors announced they would be stepping down at the end of the season. However, despite a poor season (picking up just five points and conceding over 180 goals), it was announced that Fort William would continue its involvement for the 2018-19 season.

Five games into the 2018–19 season and still pointless, the club was deducted nine points by the Highland League after fielding an ineligible player on three occasions. They finished the season with no wins and two draws from their 34 games, ending on -7 points. This led to them being dubbed "The worst football team in Britain".

In July 2019, Scottish Championship club Inverness Caledonian Thistle loaned nine players to Fort William in order to both prepare the youngsters for professional football and bolster the Fort William squad.

On 31 July 2019, Fort William won their first competitive match in 707 days when they defeated Nairn County 5–2 in a North of Scotland Cup tie, ending a 69-game run without a victory. This win came one day after BBC Scotland broadcast The Fort, a documentary on the club's winless run. After another winless month, Fort William finally recorded their first league win in 882 days on 11 September, with a 1–0 home win against Clachnacuddin.

In the 2021–22 season, Fort William finished bottom of the table and were relegated to the North Caledonian League after forfeiting their play-off match against North Superleague side Banks O' Dee F.C..

Current squad

Honours 
North Caledonian League
Champions: 1984–85
Football Times Cup
Winners: 1983–84
Chic Allan Cup
Winners: 1983–84, 1984–85
Morris Newton / SWL Cup
Winners: 1983–84, 1984–85

League positions 

All final positions are from the Highland League.

Claggan Park 

Their ground, Claggan Park, has a capacity of 1,800 - and is sometimes regarded as one of the most picturesque grounds in the United Kingdom, mainly due to the views of the nearby Ben Nevis mountain range.

Claggan Park consists of standing areas on all sides of the pitch, with one 'rustic' stand that can seat 200 spectators.
To date, the record attendance is 1,500 - recorded in a 1985 Scottish Cup 2nd round tie against Scottish League side Stirling Albion.

Often during the autumn and winter months, many home matches are postponed (usually due to a waterlogged pitch) - a consequence of the heavy rainfall the town experiences.

References

External links 
  
 Facebook
 Twitter

 
Football clubs in Scotland
Highland Football League teams
Former North Caledonian Football League teams
Association football clubs established in 1974
1974 establishments in Scotland
Football in Highland (council area)
Fort William, Highland